Ural Federal District (Uralsky federalny okrug) is one of the eight federal districts of Russia. Its population was 12,080,523 (79.9% urban) according to the 2010 Census.

The district was established on 13 May 2000 by a decree of the President of Russia. It is located at the border of the European and Asian parts of Russia. The administrative centre of the district is the city of Yekaterinburg.

The district contributes 18% to Russia's Gross Regional Product (GRP), although its population is only 8.5% of the Russian total.

General information and statistics

Ethnic composition, according to the 2010 census:

According to the 2010 Census, the district had a population of 12,080,526, of whom 82.74% were Russians (10,237,992 people), 5.14% Tatars (636,454), 2.87% Ukrainians (355,087) and 2.15% Bashkirs (265,586). The remainder comprises various ethnicities of the former Soviet Union. 79.9% of the district's population lived in urban areas.

In 2006, the district provided 90% of Russian natural gas production, 68% of oil and 42% of metal products. Industrial production per capita in the district is about 2.5 times higher than the average value throughout Russia. The district provides about 42% of Russian tax incomes, mostly from industry. Its major branches are fuel mining and production (53%), metallurgy (24%) and metal processing and engineering (8.8%). The latter two are especially developed in Chelyabinsk and Sverdlovsk Oblast which, between them, constitute 83% of Russian metallurgy and 73% of metal processing and engineering. Whereas fuel and mineral mining has been providing a nearly constant outcome between 1990 and 2006, metal processing and engineering are declining, despite the fact that they employ up to 30% of industry workers of the district. Local ore processing plants can provide only 20% of required copper, 28% chromium, 35% iron and 17% coal, and many of these resources are nearly exhausted. Meanwhile, the average distance to import them to the Ural is 2,500 km.

The district is governed by the Presidential Envoy, and individual envoys are assigned by the President of Russia to all the Oblasts of the district. Pyotr Latyshev was envoy to the Urals Federal District until his death on 2 December 2008. Nikolay Vinnichenko succeeded him on this post on 8 December 2008. On 6 September 2011 Vinnichenko was appointed the envoy to the Northwestern Federal District, and Yevgeny Kuyvashev became the Presidential Envoy in the Urals Federal District. On 18 May 2012 Vladimir Putin offered the tenure to Igor Kholmanskikh, an engineer without any previous political experience, and Kholmanskikh accepted the offer. On 26 June 2018, Kholmanskikh was replaced by Nikolay Tsukanov.

Federal subjects
The district comprises the Central (part) and West Siberian economic regions and six federal subjects:

Source for names of federal subjects: (note - source refers to 'regions' rather than Okrugs or Oblasts)

Religion

According to a 2012 survey 32.7% of the population of the Ural Federal District adheres to the Russian Orthodox Church, 6.9% are unaffiliated generic Christians, 3.4% is an Eastern Orthodox believer without belonging to any church or adheres to other (non-Russian) Eastern Orthodox churches, 6.0% is an adherent of Islam, and 1.1% adhere to some native faith such as Rodnovery. In addition, 31.2% of the population declares to be "spiritual but not religious", 12.8% is atheist, and 5.9% follows other religions or did not give an answer to the question.

Presidential plenipotentiary envoys to the Ural Federal District
Pyotr Latyshev (18 May 2000 – 2 December 2008)
Vladimir Krupkin (2 December 2008 - 8 December 2008; acting)
Nikolay Vinnichenko (8 December 2008 – 6 September 2011)
Yevgeny Kuyvashev (6 September 2011 – 14 May 2012)
Igor Kholmanskikh (18 May 2012 – 26 June 2018)
Nikolay Tsukanov (26 June 2018 – 9 November 2020)
Vladimir Yakushev (9 November 2020 – present)

References

 
Federal districts of Russia
States and territories established in 2000
2000 establishments in Russia